The memorial temple of Ramesses II, also called simply Ramesseum contains a minor list of pharaohs of ancient Egypt. The scene with the list was first published by Jean-Francois Champollion in 1845, and by Karl Richard Lepsius four years later. 

The upper register of the second western pylon, shows a processions where ancestors of Ramesses II are honored at ceremonies of the festival of Min. It contains 19 cartouches with the names of 14 pharaohs. Notably, Hatshepsut and the Amarna pharaohs are omitted.

Kings names mentioned 
The scene is divided in two parts, one with 14 statues of the ancestral kings being carried in a procession on the left side. The second part is a procession led by six kings, but only the name of five remain.

The scene remains in situ in the upper register of the second western pylon. The later Medinet Habu king list of Ramesses III is very similar in design, but only lists nine pharaohs.

References

Bibliography 
 Jean François Champollion:  Monuments de l'Égypte et de la Nubie, II, plates 149bis-150 (Paris: 1845)
 Carl Richard Lepsius:  Denkmaeler aus Aegypten und Aethiopien, III, plate 163, (Berlin: 1849)
 The Epigraphic Survey: Medinet Habu: Volume IV, OIP 51, Plate 213 (Chicago: 1940)
 Kenneth A. Kitchen: Ramesside Inscriptions, Vol V, pp. 205:9-11; 209:9-10 (Oxford: 1983)

13th-century BC works
1845 archaeological discoveries
Ancient Egyptian King lists